The 1991 MAAC men's basketball tournament was held March 1–4 at Knickerbocker Arena in Albany, New York.

Number three seed Saint Peter's defeated  in the championship game, 64–58, to win their first MAAC men's basketball tournament.

The Peacocks received an automatic bid to the 1991 NCAA tournament as the No. 12 seed in the Midwest region.

Format
All nine of the conference's members participated in the tournament field. Teams were seeded based on regular season conference records. All games were played at the new Knickerbocker Arena in Albany, New York.

Bracket

References

MAAC men's basketball tournament
1990–91 Metro Atlantic Athletic Conference men's basketball season
1991 in sports in New York (state)